Lanistes solidus is a species of large freshwater snail, an aquatic gastropod mollusk with a gill and an operculum in the family Ampullariidae, the apple snails.

Distribution 
It is found in Malawi and Mozambique.

References

Ampullariidae
Gastropods described in 1877
Taxonomy articles created by Polbot